Robert Duncan Coutts is a Canadian musician, best known for being the bassist for Our Lady Peace since 1995.

Career

Our Lady Peace 
Coutts joined Our Lady Peace on September 23, 1995, replacing Chris Eacrett after the band's debut album Naveed was produced.

Before joining Our Lady Peace, he went to Ridley College and studied film at Toronto's Ryerson University, graduating from The University of Western Ontario in 1993. He lived in Saugeen-Maitland Hall at the University of Western Ontario along with fellow Our Lady Peace band member Mike Turner. This resulted in him not immediately joining Our Lady Peace, but waiting until after their debut album, Naveed. Nevertheless, he appears as an extra in the music video for the single, Starseed, and was present in the studio during the recording of the album.

Among his jobs before joining the band were taxi driving in Whistler, British Columbia, and set dresser for the TV show Due South. Along with bass, he can play keyboards, cello, and sing back up.

References 

Alternative rock bass guitarists
Canadian alternative rock musicians
Canadian people of Scottish descent
Canadian rock bass guitarists
Living people
Musicians from St. Catharines
Musicians from Toronto
University of Western Ontario alumni
Our Lady Peace members
20th-century Canadian male actors
21st-century Canadian guitarists
Canadian rock keyboardists
Canadian rock cellists
20th-century Canadian guitarists
20th-century Canadian bass guitarists
21st-century Canadian bass guitarists
Ridley College alumni
Year of birth missing (living people)
20th-century cellists
21st-century cellists